"Is There Anybody in There?" is the twelfth single by Australian pub rock band Hunters & Collectors, released in 1986. It was released on 27 October 1986 as the fourth and final single from the album Human Frailty, in both 7" and 12" formats. "Is There Anybody in There?" peaked at number 41 on the Recorded Music NZ. ''

Track listing

Personnel 

 John Archer – bass guitar
 Doug Falconer – drums
 John 'Jack' Howard – trumpet
 Robert Miles – live sound, art director
 Mark Seymour – vocals, lead guitar
 Jeremy Smith – French horn
 Michael Waters – trombone, keyboards

Production
 Producer – Hunters & Collectors, Gavin MacKillop
 Engineer – Gavin MacKillop
 Assistant engineer – Doug Brady, Michael Streefkerk
 Recording/mixing engineer – Robert Miles
 Studio – Allan Eaton Sound, St Kilda (recording); AAV Studio One, Melbourne (mixing)

Chart performance

References 

Hunters & Collectors songs
1986 singles
1986 songs
Mushroom Records singles
Songs written by Mark Seymour